The Lamoille River is a river which runs through northern Vermont and drains into Lake Champlain. The river generally flows southwest, and then northwest, from the water divide of the Green Mountains. It is the namesake of Lamoille County, Vermont, through which it flows. The river was the basis of the name of the now-defunct Lamoille Valley Railroad Company, successor to the St. Johnsbury and Lamoille County Railroad.

Legend has it that early French settlers named the river La Mouette, meaning "The Seagull". However, a cartographer forgot to cross the t's, which led people to begin calling it La Moulle. Over time, this became Lamoille, elided in speaking.

References

See also
List of rivers of Vermont

Bodies of water of Lamoille County, Vermont
Rivers of Vermont
Tributaries of Lake Champlain